Zena Moyra Marshall (1 January 1926 – 10 July 2009) was a British actress of film and television, who was born in Kenya.

Early years 
Marshall was of English, Irish and (on her mother's side) French descent.
Though born in Kenya, after her father's death and her mother's remarriage, Zena Marshall was brought up in Leicestershire, England.

Career 
Marshall attended St Mary's, Ascot and trained at the Royal Academy of Dramatic Art (RADA). She worked with Ensa (the Entertainments National Service Association) during the Second World War.

Marshall first acted on stage. Her film career began with a small role in Caesar and Cleopatra (1945), with Claude Rains and Vivien Leigh. Her exotic looks resulted in her being cast in "ethnic" roles, such as Asian women, including her role as the Chinese character Miss Taro, in the first James Bond film, Dr. No (1962). She also appeared in Those Magnificent Men in Their Flying Machines (1965) as the Countess Ponticelli, and made numerous television appearances. Her last film performance was in The Terrornauts in 1967.

Personal life 
Marshall married bandleader Paul Adam in 1947 and later wed Alexander Ward, before her final marriage to film producer Ivan Foxwell (1914–2002). All these unions were childless.

Death 
Zena Marshall died of cancer in 2009, aged 83. She was interred in St Thomas a Becket Churchyard, Skeffington, Harborough District, Leicestershire, England.

Filmography

Film

Television

References

External links 
 
 

1926 births
2009 deaths
Actresses from London
Alumni of RADA
British people of English descent
British people of French descent
British people of Irish descent
British film actresses
British television actresses
Deaths from cancer in England
People educated at St Mary's School, Ascot
Actresses from Leicestershire
20th-century British actresses
20th-century English women
20th-century English people